"Way of Life" is the only single by rapper Lil Wayne from his album 500 Degreez. It features Big Tymers and TQ. The song samples "Don't Look Any Further" by Dennis Edwards featuring Siedah Garrett.

"Way of Life" references "Paid in Full" ("Paid in Full" also samples "Don't Look Any Further") also samples with Mannie Fresh saying at the end "What happened to peace? Peace."

Credits

Formats and track listings
12" Vinyl
 A1. "Way of Life" (Main)
 A2. "Way of Life" (Clean)
 B1. "Way of Life" (Instr.)
 B2. "Way of Life" (TV track)

Charts

References 

2002 singles
Lil Wayne songs
Big Tymers songs
Cash Money Records singles
Song recordings produced by Mannie Fresh
Songs written by Lil Wayne
Songs written by Dennis Lambert
Songs written by Franne Golde
Songs written by Duane Hitchings
2002 songs
Songs written by Mannie Fresh